Christopher Clive Langton Gregory (13 May 1892 – 24 November 1964) was a British astronomer, who established the University of London Observatory.

Gregory was born in Parkstone, Dorset and lived in Swanage, Dorset in 1911 and in Hendon, Middlesex in 1939. He died in Crookham-with-Ewshott, Hampshire.

His son by his first wife, Helen Patricia (née Gibson), was the psychologist Richard Gregory (1923–2010). His second wife was Anita (née Kohsen).

The National Portrait Gallery has a photograph of Gregory taken in 1939.

References

External links
Obituary at Quarterly Journal of the Royal Astronomical Society, Vol. 7, p. 81, by E. Margaret Burbidge

1892 births
1964 deaths
People from Parkstone
20th-century British astronomers